WWKZ (103.9 FM, KZ 103), is a Top 40 radio station licensed to Okolona, Mississippi, and is owned by iHeartMedia, Inc., through licensee iHM Licenses, LLC.  WWKZ serves Tupelo and Northeast Mississippi with an ERP of 50,000 Watts at 103.9 FM.

History
WWKZ began broadcasting in 1983 on 103.5 FM and was there until June 1998, when the license was moved to Como to serve the Memphis market as WRBO. WWKZ's owners then moved the Top 40 format to 105.3 WWZQ-FM, and the station became "KZ105". After the frequency change, WWKZ did not have the coverage area it once had, it remained at 105.3 FM until about mid-2005 when WWKZ and WACR (103.9 now at 105.3) swapped frequencies. WWKZ once again became KZ103 and uses the slogan "Today's Best Music @ 103.9FM".

Former programming
WWKZ is an affiliate of The Rockin' America Top 30 Countdown with Scott Shannon in the 1980s.

External links
 

WKZ
Contemporary hit radio stations in the United States
IHeartMedia radio stations